This is a list of beverage-related list articles on Wikipedia.

By substance
  List of rice beverages
  List of hot beverages

Non-psychoactive
  List of herbal teas
  List of brand name soft drinks products
  List of lemon dishes and beverages
  List of lemonade topics
  List of national drinks
  List of soft drink producers
  List of soft drinks by country
  List of soft drink flavors
  Water

Psychoactive

Alcohol

Beverages

  Beer and breweries by region
  List of alcoholic drinks
  List of cider brands
  List of liqueurs
  List of national liquors
  List of rum producers
  List of tequilas
  List of vodkas
  List of whisky brands

Cocktails

  List of cocktails
  Beer cocktail
  Cocktails with cachaça
  Highball
  List of cocktails with wine, sparkling wine, or port
  List of martini variations
  Well drink
  Wine cocktail

Caffeine
  List of chocolate beverages
  List of coffee beverages
  List of energy drinks

By country

 List of Bolivian drinks
 List of Brazilian drinks
 List of Chinese teas
 List of Indian beverages
 List of Indonesian beverages
 List of Italian DOC wines
 List of Italian DOCG wines
 List of Italian IGT wines
 List of Korean beverages
 List of U.S. state beverages

See also